Tom Laterza (born 9 May 1992) is a Luxembourgian international footballer who plays in Luxembourg for Mondercange, as a right back.

Career
Laterza played club football in France for Sedan B from 2009 to 2012.

He made his international debut for Luxembourg in 2009, and has appeared in UEFA European Football Championship and FIFA World Cup qualifying matches.

In 2012, he moved to the Luxembourg National Division club CS Fola Esch, and then in 2019 moved to Progres Niedercorn.

References

1992 births
Living people
Luxembourgian footballers
Luxembourg international footballers
Association football defenders
CS Fola Esch players
Luxembourg National Division players